William Bain Gill (1842–1919) was an American actor and playwright, most famous for authoring Broadway's first hit musical, Adonis

Born in Newfoundland in 1842, Gill spent the early part of his career as an actor in Australia and India. Gill ultimately moved to the United States with his wife and children where he again took up acting.  Over time, Gill transitioned to play writing.

Gill's early plays were met with mixed critical reviews, until he penned Adonis. Gill's Adonis began playing on Broadway in 1884 and ran for an unprecedented 603 performances, becoming the longest running show in Broadway history up until that time and the first Broadway show to run for at least 500 performances. At its peak, Adonis earned approximately $7,000 per week in box office sales (the equivalent of over $250,000 in 2011 dollars).

References

1842 births
1919 deaths
People from Newfoundland (island)
American dramatists and playwrights